John Tilson may refer to:
John Q. Tilson, American politician
John Tilson (cricketer) (1845–1895), cricketer